The Prochilodontidae, or flannel-mouthed characins, are a small family of freshwater fishes found primarily in the northern half of South America, south to Paraguay and northern Argentina. This family is closely related to the Curimatidae, and in the past they were included in Characidae.

These fish have fleshy lips with rows of small teeth; their lips are able to be extended into a sucking disc. They travel upriver to spawn, and make audible grunting noises that have been described as resembling the sound of a motorbike.

Species
The family has around 21 species in three genera:
Ichthyoelephas
 Ichthyoelephas humeralis
 Ichthyoelephas longirostris
Prochilodus
 Prochilodus argenteus
 Prochilodus brevis - Brazilian bocachico
 Prochilodus britskii
 Prochilodus costatus
 Prochilodus hartii
 Prochilodus lacustris
 Prochilodus lineatus - streaked prochilod
 Prochilodus magdalenae
 Prochilodus mariae
 Prochilodus nigricans - black prochilodus
 Prochilodus reticulatus - Colombian bocachico
 Prochilodus rubrotaeniatus
 Prochilodus vimboides
Semaprochilodus
 Semaprochilodus brama
 Semaprochilodus insignis
 Semaprochilodus kneri
 Semaprochilodus laticeps
 Semaprochilodus taeniurus - silver prochilodus
 Semaprochilodus varii

References

 
Ray-finned fish families